Warembori (native name ) is a moribund language spoken by about 600 people in Warembori village, Mamberamo Hilir District, Mamberamo Raya Regency, located around river mouths (including the mouth of the Warembari River) on the north coast of Papua, Indonesia.

Classification

Classification is in dispute. Mark Donohue thinks it is related to Yoke, forming together the Lower Mamberamo family. On a 200 word list, they share 33%. Also there are some grammar similarities. According to Donohue, Warembori is heavily influenced by Austronesian languages to the west, in both vocabulary and grammar, Yoke is less influenced by them. More recent researchers (Dunn & Reesink, Foley, Kamholz) have classified Warembori and Yoke as  Austronesian languages. Malcolm Ross leaves Yoke unclassified due to lack of data, apparently referring to the fact that Donohue did not publish independent pronouns in Yoke. He did publish subject prefixes on verbs, which are very similar to Warembori, and the singular prefixes are also remarkably similar to two Kwerba family languages, namely Kauwera and Airoran, suggesting either borrowing or a distant relationship to Kwerba, though the Kwerba family shares almost no vocabulary with the Lower Mamberamo family. The Lower Mamberamo plural prefixes are similar to Austronesian, as are the plural object suffixes and, at least in Warembori, plural independent pronouns.

Phonology

Vowels

Consonants

The heavy stops do not lenite.

When a nasal is followed by a heavy plosive, it is lengthened, i.e. . When not followed by a stop, heavy nasals are long and preceded by a glottal closure, i.e. . Heavy consonants also attract stress.

Some minimal pairs of heavy consonants are:

 'mouth',  'thorn'
 'crocodile',  'jungle'

Grammar

The independent pronouns are:

The dual pronouns are derived from the plural via the infix . Although 3sg  might also derive from Austronesian , 1sg  and 2sc , the most basic pronouns, have no parallel in Austronesian.

Possessive prefixes on nouns are nearly identical to subject prefixes on verbs. The object suffixes are also similar; the paradigm is very close to that of Yoke, apart from an inclusive-exclusive distinction which is not completely grammaticalized in the case of possessives.

The singular prefixes of Warembori and Yoke are nearly identical to the 1sg e-, 2sg a-, 3sg i- of the Kwerba languages Kauwera and Airoran. However, Kwerba has no more basic vocabulary in common with the Lower Mamberamo family than what is expected by chance.

Writing system
Warembori is written in a Latin alphabet based on the Indonesian. It represents phonetic, rather than phonemic, distinctions. In particular:
 is written v
 is written r
 is written ngg

References

Rumaikewi, Luther, Lea Rumansao and Mark Donohue. 1998. Warembori Dictionary''. Unpublished ms, University of Sydney.

External links
Donohue, 1998, 'Warembori, and the Lower Mamberamo family'

Lower Mamberamo languages
Languages of western New Guinea